Bernard Haykel (born 1968) is professor of Near Eastern Studies and the director of the Institute for Transregional Study of the Contemporary Middle East, North Africa and Central Asia at Princeton University. He has been described as "the foremost secular authority on the Islamic State’s ideology" by journalist Graeme C.A. Wood.

Haykel, of "partially" Lebanese ancestry, grew up in Lebanon and in the United States. He was awarded a Fulbright Fellowship in Yemen in 1992–1993. He obtained a bachelor's degree in International Politics at Georgetown University, MA, M Phil and, in 1998, Ph.D. in Islamic and Middle-Eastern Studies from the University of Oxford. After working as a post-doctoral research fellow at Oxford University in Islamic Studies, he joined New York University in 1998 as associate professor before taking up his post at Princeton. He became a Guggenheim Fellow in 2010. He is a member of the board of directors of the Arab Gulf States Institute in Washington.

In addition to English, Haykel is fluent in Arabic and French and has taught advanced level Arabic at Georgetown, Oxford and Princeton.

Books
Saudi Arabia in Transition; Insights on Social, Political, Economic and Religious Change.(Cambridge University Press, 2015) co-editor with Thomas Hegghammer, and Stéphane Lacroix.
Revival and Reform in Islam: the Legacy of Muhammad al-Shawkānī (Cambridge Studies in Islamic Civilization, Cambridge University Press, 2003).

References

External links
 Bernard Haykel: A lot of Muslims are embarrassed by ISIS. Anderson Cooper 360°.  CNN. February 23, 2015

American people of Lebanese descent
21st-century American historians
21st-century American male writers
American historians of Islam
Living people
Alumni of the University of Oxford
Princeton University faculty
1968 births
American male non-fiction writers